Caparison Guitars is a Japanese-origin manufacturer of high end, hand made, boutique electric guitars. The company is headquartered in Japan and is a subsidiary of "Caparison Guitar Company Ltd.", based in the United Kingdom.

History
The company was established in 1995 with the former Jackson/Charvel Japan design division. The Charvel designers created the CDS Series, CDS II Series and Questar Series while the Jackson designed contributed with the Doug Aldrich, Soloist Special, Dinky AXE and Falcon models. Caparison was owned by Kyowa Shokai Ltd, a company that made contracts with factories to produce guitars for them (like Hoshino Gakki).

In May 2011 Kyowa Shokai was declared bankrupt, however Caparison resumed production in September 2011 under the ownership of the Caparison Guitar Company Ltd., which is a limited company in Cardiff, United Kingdom. The company retained  as lead designer and the instruments continue being manufactured together with Iida Corporation in Nagoya, Japan.

Guitars
One of the company's best selling guitars is their "Horus" model. This guitar features a 27-fret neck with unique clock inlays that shows a different time for each fret position (1 o'clock on the first fret, 3 o'clock on the third, 5 o'clock on the fifth fret, etc.). TAT Special (Through and Through), and Orbit models also feature 27-fret necks.

Their Dellinger models also feature these clock inlays on the fretboard, however, these guitars feature 24-fret necks. Other Caparison Guitar models are the Angelus (including the ACE signature models), Susanoh,  Michael Romeo Signature Dellinger Prominence MJR, Joel Stroetzel Signature Dellinger-JSM and Mattias IA Elkundh Signature Apple Horn 8. The Orbit is also a notable guitar due to its unusual take on the standard 'Flying V' shape; the Orbit has an added a curve at the left of the neck joint and an elongated upper 'horn'.

Caparison design their own humbucking, single coil, and dual-rail humbucking pickups, which are produced by Gotoh Pick Ups located in Nagano, Japan. The dual-rail humbucking pickup fits into the footprint of standard single coil pickup. Caparison also design their own fixed bridge (produced by Gotoh Gut Co., ltd.).

References

External links
 

Guitar manufacturing companies
Musical instrument manufacturing companies of Japan